Ezequiel Alexis Medrán (born 20 December 1980) is a retired Argentine footballer who played as goalkeeper and current manager of Atlético de Rafaela.

Coaching career
On 7 December 2018, Medrán was appointed manager of his former club, Torneo Federal A side Central Norte, in what would be his first ever coaching experience. In his first season at the club, he won promotion to the 2020 Primera Nacional. On 17 May 2022, Medrán was appointed manager of one of his other former clubs, Atlético de Rafaela.

Honours

Club
Boca Juniors
 Apertura Tournament (2): 2005, 2008
 Clausura Tournament (1): 2006
 Copa Sudamericana (2): 2004, 2005
 Recopa Sudamericana (1): 2005

Cerro Porteño
 Paraguayan Primera División (1): 2009

References

External links
 Medrán at Football Lineups
 
 

1980 births
Living people
People from Rafaela
Argentine footballers
Argentine expatriate footballers
Association football goalkeepers
Atlético de Rafaela footballers
Argentine Primera División players
Boca Juniors footballers
Club Atlético Belgrano footballers
San Martín de San Juan footballers
Lobos BUAP footballers
Cerro Porteño players
Chilean Primera División players
Deportes La Serena footballers
Argentine expatriate sportspeople in Chile
Expatriate footballers in Chile
Expatriate footballers in Mexico
Argentine expatriate sportspeople in Mexico
Argentine expatriate sportspeople in Paraguay
Expatriate footballers in Paraguay
Sportspeople from Santa Fe Province
Argentine football managers
Atlético de Rafaela managers